2021–22 Malaysia Purple League (also known as SENHENG redONE Purple League for sponsorship reasons) was the sixth edition of Malaysia Purple League offering a total prize of RM500,000 (US$110,000).  It started on 1 October 2022 and will conclude on 9 October 2022. It will consist of 28 league ties (each tie consisting of 5 matches) in Stage 1. Top two teams in Stage 1, progressed to the knockout stage. Meanwhile the rest to the Stage 1 (divided into 2 groups) to accumulates points to contest four remaining spots for finals stage.

In this edition of the league, clubs from Indonesia, Thailand, Vietnam and Singapore would make their first ever appearance in the league.

Squads

Group stage

Group A

Group B

Fixtures

Finals stage

Bracket

Semi-finals

3rd & 4th placing

Final

Final standings

Broadcasters

References

External links 

 Tournament Link

Malaysia Purple League
Malaysia Purple League
Badminton tournaments in Malaysia